Düsseldorf-Friedrichstadt station is a through station in the district of Friedrichstadt in the city of Düsseldorf in the German state of North Rhine-Westphalia. The station was opened on 29 May 1988 on the new line opened by the Prussian state railways on 1 October 1891 between the Hamm Railway Bridge and Gerresheim as part of the construction of Düsseldorf Hauptbahnhof. It has two platform tracks and it is classified by Deutsche Bahn as a category 5 station.

The station is served by Rhine-Ruhr S-Bahn lines S 8 between Mönchengladbach and Wuppertal-Oberbarmen or Hagen, S 11 between Düsseldorf Airport and Bergisch Gladbach and S 28 between Mettmann Stadtwald or Wuppertal and Kaarster See, each every 20 minutes.

References

Footnotes

Sources

Railway stations in Düsseldorf
Rhine-Ruhr S-Bahn stations
S8 (Rhine-Ruhr S-Bahn)
S11 (Rhine-Ruhr S-Bahn)
S28 (Rhine-Ruhr S-Bahn)
Railway stations in Germany opened in 1988